The 2010 Brickyard 400, the 17th running of the event, was a NASCAR Sprint Cup Series stock car race held on July 25, 2010 at Indianapolis Motor Speedway in Indianapolis, Indiana. Contested over 160 laps, it was the twentieth race of the 2010 Sprint Cup Series season. The race was won by Jamie McMurray, for the Earnhardt Ganassi Racing team. Kevin Harvick finished second, and Greg Biffle, who started seventh, clinched third.

There were seven cautions and fourteen lead changes among ten different drivers throughout the course of the race, McMurray's second win of the season and his first ever at Indianapolis. The result moved him up two spots to sixteenth in the Drivers' Championship, 625 points behind of leader Kevin Harvick and five ahead of Kasey Kahne. Chevrolet maintained its lead in the Manufacturers' Championship, twenty points ahead of Toyota and fifty-three ahead of Ford, with twenty races remaining in the season.

Report

Background

Prior to the race, Richard Childress Racing driver Kevin Harvick led the Drivers' Championship with 2,745 points, and Hendrick Motorsports driver Jeff Gordon was second with 2,642 points. Behind them in the Drivers' Championship, Jimmie Johnson was third with 2,557 points, and Denny Hamlin was fourth with 2,542 points. Kurt Busch was fifth with 2,524 points. In the Manufacturers' Championship, Chevrolet was leading with 134 points, fifteen points ahead of their rival Toyota. In the battle for third place, Dodge had 84 points, three ahead of Ford.

Practice and qualifying
Four practice sessions were held before the Sunday race—two on Friday and two on Saturday. The practice sessions each lasted 60 minutes. In the first practice session, Juan Pablo Montoya was quickest, ahead of Jimmie Johnson, Max Papis, and Robby Gordon. Bill Elliott was fifth quickest. In the Friday evening practice session, Montoya remained quickest, ahead of Jamie McMurray and Mark Martin in second and third. Clint Bowyer was fourth fastest as Johnson was fifth. In the third practice session, Jeff Burton was quickest, ahead of his teammate Bowyer in second. Kevin Harvick was third quickest, and Kasey Kahne was scored fourth. Matt Kenseth rounded out the top five with a time of 51.425. During the fourth and final practice session for the race, Martin Truex Jr. was quickest, ahead of Burton and Bowyer in the second and third positions. Carl Edwards and Martin followed to round out the top five quickest drivers.

During qualifying, forty-seven drivers were entered, but only the fastest forty-three raced because of NASCAR's qualifying procedure. Montoya clinched the pole position, with a time of 49.375.  He was joined on the front row of the grid by Johnson. Mark Martin only managed to qualify third, and McMurray qualified fourth.  Ryan Newman qualified fifth with a time of 49.521. Bowyer, Greg Biffle, Jeff Gordon, Harvick and Burton rounded off the top ten. The four drivers that did not qualify were David Gilliland, Casey Mears, David Stremme, and J. J. Yeley.

Race
The race, twentieth out of a total of thirty-six in the season, began at 1 p.m. EDT and was televised live in the United States on ESPN. Howard Brammer, of Traders Point Christian Church, began pre-race ceremonies by delivering the invocation. Afterward, Sparrow Records recording artist Steven Curtis Chapman sang the United States National Anthem and Indianapolis Motor Speedway chairman Mari Hulman George gave the command to start engines. Then, Joey Logano and Todd Bodine moved to the rear of the grid during the pace laps because of engine changes. Herb Branham, a NASCAR spokesman, announced that there would be a competition caution on lap 15.

Juan Pablo Montoya held the lead through the first corner, as Jimmie Johnson followed in the second position. Later on the same lap, a multiple car accident brought out the first caution. While under caution, Elliott Sadler, who was involved in the accident, drove his race car to the garage for repairs, and Sam Hornish Jr. received a stop and go penalty for speeding on pit road. On lap 8, Montoya led the grid to the green flag. Two laps later, Ryan Newman went to pit road because of a flat tire. On lap 12, Carl Edwards, Denny Hamlin, A. J. Allmendinger, and Dale Earnhardt Jr. came to pit lane because of engine overheating issues. Also on the same lap, Newman returned to pit lane because another tire was flat.

On lap 16, the second caution came out because Robby Gordon had a tire explode and Max Papis's car was engulfed in flames. On lap 18, Landon Cassill was scored the leader, but before the restart he drove to pit lane for a pit stop. Afterward, Kevin Conway became the leader before giving it to Johnson for the restart because of beating Montoya off pit lane. On lap 22, Montoya became the leader after passing Johnson. Five laps later, Mark Martin passed Johnson for the second position. On lap 31, Greg Biffle moved into the fourth position, after passing his teammate Matt Kenseth. Six laps later, Biffle passed Johnson for the third position. One lap later, because of a loose wheel, Montoya came to pit lane and gave Martin the lead. On lap 47, Johnson fell to fifth, after being passed by Jamie McMurray and Clint Bowyer. One lap later, Johnson lost the fifth position to Kevin Harvick.

On lap 49, Biffle became the leader, as Martin began green flag pit stops. One lap later, Tony Stewart move into the first position after Biffle came to pit lane. After the pit stops ended, Montoya retained the first position. On lap 62, Biffle moved into the lead, after passing Montoya. Four laps later, the third caution came out because of debris on the race surface. Four laps later, the green flag waved with Biffle in the lead. On lap 78, Johnson and Scott Speed collided, all with minor damage except Speed had a tire go flat because of the contact. Ten laps later, Stewart moved into the eleventh position after passing Jeff Gordon. By lap 95, Biffle had a six tenths of a second lead over Montoya. Three laps later, green flag pit stops began. On lap 99, Carl Edwards passed Biffle and Montoya, as they drove to pit road. One lap later, Montoya became the leader. By laps 108, Montoya had a one and a half second lead over the second position. On lap 117, debris caused the fourth caution flag to be waved. All drivers drove to pit road to receive new tires and fuel, but Johnson and his crew were changing shocks.

Montoya led the drivers to the restart on lap 122. After seven laps, Montoya had a two-second lead over his teammate McMurray. Montoya's two-second lead reduced to nothing on lap 138 when the safety car was brought on the track because of the fifth caution. During the pit stops, McMurray's team chose to change two tires, while his teammate Montoya chose to change four tires. On the restart, McMurray led the drivers to the green flag, while Montoya was in the sixth position. Three laps later, on lap 146, the sixth caution came out because Montoya collided with the wall, drove toward pit road, as Dale Earnhardt Jr., collided with him. Also on the same lap, Harvick passed McMurray for the lead. On lap 150, Harvick led the drivers to the green flag, but one lap later McMurray passed him. McMurray continued to lead, and crossed the finish line first to win his second race of the season. Harvick finished second, ahead of Biffle and Bowyer in third and fourth. Stewart clinched the fifth position. McMurray's win gave his owner Chip Ganassi the trifecta, or winning the Daytona 500, Indianapolis 500, and the Brickyard 400 in the same year.

Post-race
The race result left Kevin Harvick leading the Driver's Championship with 2,920 points. Jeff Gordon was second with 2,736, seventy-six points ahead of Denny Hamlin and seventy-seven ahead of Jimmie Johnson. Kurt Busch was fifth with 2,658 points. In the Manufacturers' Championship, Chevrolet maintained their lead with 143 points. Toyota remained second with 1123 points. Ford followed with 90 points, six ahead of Dodge in fourth.

Classification

Qualifying

Race Results

References

Brickyard 400
Brickyard 400
NASCAR races at Indianapolis Motor Speedway
July 2010 sports events in the United States